Taxillus kaempferi is a parasitic plant species in the genus Taxillus found in China (Anhui, Fujian, W Hubei, S Jiangxi, Sichuan, S Zhejiang), Bhutan and Japan. Its host is Pinus thunbergii.

The flavonol avicularin can be produced from T. kaempferi. Other flavonoids constituents of the plant are hyperin, quercitrin and taxillusin.

References

Loranthaceae
Parasitic plants
Plants described in 1933
Flora of Anhui
Flora of Fujian
Flora of Hubei
Flora of Jiangxi
Flora of Sichuan
Flora of Zhejiang
Flora of Bhutan
Flora of Japan
Taxa named by Augustin Pyramus de Candolle